Black Oil  may refer to:
 black oil, an alien virus in the X-Files
 a sunflower variety
 19th century Australian term for oil from the Right Whale

See also
 Fuel oil
 Petroleum